"Temptation" is a single by British band Heaven 17, originally released in April 1983, peaking at number two on the UK Singles Chart. This was the second single to be taken from their second album, The Luxury Gap, after "Let Me Go" in November 1982.  "Temptation" was certified silver by the BPI in May 1983, for sales exceeding 250,000 copies.

Composition and recording
Martyn Ware explained the subject matter of the song as "I woke up one morning and thought I've got to write a song about sex, I've never written a song about sex. So the song is about rising sexual tension; it has chords that keep going up like an [M. C.] Escher staircase and in the end there's this big release." Glenn Gregory later recalled that he laughed "when Martyn walked in and said he had this great idea for a song based on the Lord’s Prayer with a never-ending chord structure" (the line "lead us not into temptation" is taken from the Lord's Prayer).

Carol Kenyon provided guest vocals on the recording and continued to work with the band on the Pleasure One and Teddy Bear, Duke & Psycho albums. The song featured a 60-piece orchestra, arranged and conducted by John Wesley Barker, which was also featured on the single "Come Live with Me" and a third track on the parent album. In a 2016 interview Ware said that he told Barker that he wanted the arrangement to be "sweeping and expressionistic", giving the theme from The Big Country as an example of the kind of sound required.

Performance
Heaven 17 performed this song on Top of the Pops''' 1000th edition in 1983.

Remix and re-recording
In 1992, the song was remixed by Brothers in Rhythm and released on 9 November 1992. This version charted at No. 4 on the UK Singles Chart, and reached No. 1 in the UK Dance Chart. The 1992 remix of "Temptation" was certified silver by the British Phonographic Industry (BPI) in January 1993 for sales exceeding 200,000 copies.

In 2008, the song was re-recorded for Heaven 17's album Naked as Advertised with Billie Godfrey as guest vocalist. On 19 October 2010, Heaven 17 performed the song on Later... with Jools Holland on BBC Two in the United Kingdom.

Music video
The music video for "Temptation" was directed by Steve Barron. It shows the band dressed in black in drab surroundings in a style of German Expressionism, and has segments of what looks like an abstract office interview between vocalist Glenn Gregory and actor Gillian de Terville. Kenyon does not appear in the video because of a disagreement over appearance money.

Charts
Original version

Brothers in Rhythm remix

Cover versions
At the  NME Awards 2007, Jarvis Cocker and Beth Ditto performed "Temptation", and released it as a charity single.

Cradle of Filth covered the song in 2006 on their album Thornography.

Heaven 17 collaborated on a new performance of the song with La Roux at Maida Vale Studios on 26 January 2010 for BBC 6 Music. At Glastonbury on 25 June 2010, Glenn Gregory was invited on stage to perform the version again with La Roux during their set.

References in popular culture
"Temptation" was used in the 1996 film Trainspotting'' and appears on the second volume of the official soundtrack. It was also used in the 2010 Plusnet advert, where the band were featured in a tongue-in-cheek appearance performing the song.

References

1983 singles
1992 singles
2006 singles
2008 singles
Charity singles
Cradle of Filth songs
Heaven 17 songs
Jarvis Cocker songs
Live singles
Music videos directed by Steve Barron
Music Week number-one dance singles
Songs written by Glenn Gregory
Songs written by Ian Craig Marsh
Songs written by Martyn Ware
1983 songs
Virgin Records singles